Hypodermella is a genus of fungi within the Rhytismataceae family. The genus contains three species.

References

External links
Hypodermella at Index Fungorum

Leotiomycetes